Qualification for table tennis at the 2020 Summer Paralympics began on 1 January 2019 and ended on 31 March 2021. There were 174 male athlete and 106 female athlete quotas in 31 events for the sport.

Timeline

Quotas
The qualification slots are allocated to the individual athlete not the NPC that they represent.
 An NPC can enter a maximum of three athletes in any of each individual medal event (33 male; 30 female).
 An NPC can enter one team (minimum of two, maximum of three from individual events) in any of each team event.

Men's events 
As of July 2021.
Class 1

Class 2

Class 3

Class 4

Class 5

Class 6

Class 7

Class 8

Class 9

Class 10

Class 11

Women's events
As of July 2021.
Class 1-2

Class 3

Class 4

Class 5

Class 6

Class 7

Class 8

Class 9

Class 10

Class 11

See also
Table tennis at the 2020 Summer Olympics – Qualification

References

Table tennis at the Summer Paralympics